Jhenidah Sadar is an upazila of Jhenaidah District in the Division of Khulna, Bangladesh.

Geography
It has a total area 467.75 km2.

Demographics

According to the 2011 Bangladesh census, Jhenaidah Sadar Upazila had 108,924 households and a population of 455,932, 23.8% of whom lived in urban areas. 8.8% of the population was under the age of 5. The literacy rate (age 7 and over) was 51.8%, compared to the national average of 51.8%.

Points of interest
Naldanga Temple Complex:, in the jhenaidah Upazila, is a temple complex built in 1656 by Maharaj Indranarayan Debroy. There are a total of six temples now. The government restored all of them in 1980 but they were destroyed again during the riot and now most of them are in ruins. Renovations are still going on. The idol of goddess Kali was from Banaras, India.

Administration
Jhenaidah Sadar Upazila is divided into Jhenaidah Municipality and 17 union parishads: Dogachhi, Furshondi, Ganna, Ghorshal, Halidhani, Harishongkorpur, Kalicharanpur, Kumrabaria, Maharazpur, Modhuhati, Naldanga, Padmakar, Paglakanai, Porahati, Sadhuhati, Saganna, and Surat. The union parishads are subdivided into 268 mauzas and 284 villages.

Jhenaidah Municipality is subdivided into 9 wards and 34 mahallas.

Transport

 All Transportation of Bangladesh are available in Jhenaidah without Train and Plain.

See also
Upazilas of Bangladesh
Districts of Bangladesh
Divisions of Bangladesh

References

Upazilas of Jhenaidah District
Khulna Division
Jhenaidah District